Ficus fulva is a fig species in the family Moraceae.  No subspecies are recorded and the native range of this species is from Bangladesh to Indo-China and throughout Malesia.  The species can be found in Vietnam: where it may be called ngái vàng, ngái lông, or vả. Ficus fulva is dioecious, with male and female flowers produced on separate individuals.

References

External links 
 
 

fulva
Trees of Vietnam
Flora of Indo-China
Flora of Malesia
Dioecious plants